Mustafa Yektaoğlu (born 1951 in Nicosia, Cyprus) is a Turkish Cypriot doctor and politician. He studied at the Istanbul Faculty of Medicine at Istanbul University graduating in 1978. He later specialised in Germany, where he worked until 1986. After 1988, he wrote a column in the newspaper Yeni Düzen. He served as a member of the board of directors of the Cyprus Turkish Medical Association and the doctors' union Tıp-İş. He was a member of the Assembly of Northern Cyprus between 2005 and 2013 (he was elected twice, in 2005 and 2009) as a member of Republican Turkish Party representing the Lefkoşa District. He served a s the vice-speaker of the assembly between 6 May 2009 and 12 August 2013.

Educational background

 1962 - Atatürk Primary School Nicosia-Cyprus
 1965 - Bayraktar Secondary School
 1969 - Nicosia Turkish High School
 1978 - Hacettepe Faculty of Medicine-Istanbul Faculty of Medicine
 1985 - Specialization Germany Urology

References 

Istanbul University Faculty of Medicine alumni
1951 births
Living people
Republican Turkish Party politicians
People from Nicosia
Turkish Cypriot expatriates in Turkey
Turkish Cypriot expatriates in Germany
Hacettepe University alumni